Statistics of Dhivehi League in the 2001 season.

Overview
Club Valencia won the Dhivehi League. Victory Sports Club won the Maldives National Championship.

References
RSSSF

Dhivehi League seasons
Maldives
Maldives
1